The Flying Scot is an American sailing dinghy that was designed by Sandy Douglass as a one-design racer and first built in 1958.

Production
The design has been previously built by Tanzer Industries, Douglass & McLeod, Customflex and  Loftland Sail-craft. Today it is built by Flying Scot, Inc. in Deer Park, Maryland, United States. A total of 5,300 boats have been completed.

Design
The Flying Scot is a recreational sailboat, built predominantly of fiberglass with a balsa core. It has a fractional sloop rig with aluminum spars. The hull has a raked stem, a plumb transom, a transom-hung rudder controlled by a tiller and a retractable centerboard that weighs  and is raised with a 6:1 mechanical advantage assist. The boat displaces  and has foam flotation under the seats for safety.

The hulls are all one-design and built from the same molds.

A boom vang and mainsail roller furling are permitted under class rules. The rules also prohibit the use of hiking straps, trapezes, leech cords, Barber haulers, twings or self-bailers. Mast adjustment is also not allowed while racing.

The design has a Portsmouth Yardstick racing average handicap of 90.3 and is normally raced with a crew of three sailors, although the boat can accommodate as many as eight people.

Operational history
The boat is supported by an active class association, the Flying Scot Sailing Association, which controls the boat's design and organizes racing regattas. By 2020, the club had 118 fleets racing the boat.

In a 1994 review Richard Sherwood wrote, "a big, fast centerboard boat, the Flying Scot has an unusual reverse sheer. Capacity is eight adults. With hard bilges and a slightly tunneled hull, stability is good. Rigging is relatively simple, and the class rules discourage complexity."

The design was inducted into the American Sailboat Hall of Fame in 1998. The citation says in part: "a hotshot small boat sailor with a penchant for planing, designer Gordon "Sandy" Douglass was already famous in 1957 for high speed creations: the 17-foot Thistle and 20-foot Highlander. For his new design, he reined in his desire for all-out performance to produce a moderate boat that could still sail well, but be managed easily by a couple. This meant reducing sail area and letting the hull form swell for stability: then simplifying the rigging and deck layout, installing spacious and comfortable seats, and building it on the heavier, more durable side, Douglass found the rest of the formula."

In a 2017 review in Soundings, Joni Palmer, manager of the US Naval Academy’s sailing program said, "It’s not a high-performance boat, so anybody can get into the boat. You can’t tweak everything. It’s hard to gain an edge. You have to concentrate on tactics and speed. It’s just a solid boat. But these boats do plane!"

See also
List of sailing boat types

References

External links

Dinghies
1950s sailboat type designs
Sailboat type designs by Sandy Douglass
Sailboat types built by Tanzer Industries
Sailboat types built by Customflex
Sailboat types built by Loftland Sail-craft
Sailboat types built by Flying Scot, Inc.
Sailboat types built by Douglass & McLeod